Bharat Dynamics Limited (BDL) is one of India's  manufacturers of ammunitions and missile systems. It was founded in 1970 in Hyderabad, India. BDL was established to be a manufacturing base for guided weapon systems and begun with a pool of engineers drawn from Indian Ordnance Factories, DRDO and aerospace industries, It began by producing a first generation anti-tank guided missile - the French SS11B1. This product was a culmination of a licence agreement the Government of India entered into with Aerospatiale. BDL has three manufacturing units, located at Kanchanbagh, Hyderabad; Bhanur, Medak district, and Visakhapatnam, Andhra Pradesh.

Two new units are planned at Ibrahimpatnam, Ranga Reddy district, Telangana and Amravati, Maharashtra.

History
India began to develop indigenous missiles through the Integrated Guided Missile Development Programme (IGMDP), which gave BDL an opportunity to be closely involved with the programme wherein it was identified as the Prime Production Agency. This opened up a plethora of opportunities to assimilate advanced manufacturing and programme management technologies and skills. Responding to the Concurrent Engineering Approaches adopted by DRDO in IGMDP, BDL was seen as a reliable and trust worthy ally, and resulted in the induction of India's first state-of- the-art Surface-to-Surface Missile Prithvi. BDL has delivered Prithvi to the three services as per requirements. BDL has forayed into the field of under water weapon systems and air-to-air missiles and associated equipment with technology support from the DRDO and other players in this domain.

Operations
BDL has been consistently incurring profits and has been nominated as a Mini Ratna – Category-I Company by the Government of India. Showing steady progress in its operations over the years, BDL achieved a record sales turnover of ₹1,075 crore in 2012–13. BDL has orders worth over ₹1,800 crore. Keeping pace with the modernisation of the Indian Armed Forces, BDL is poised to enter new avenues of manufacturing covering a wide range of weapon systems such as: Surface to Air Missiles, Air Defence Systems, Heavy Weight Torpedoes, Air to Air Missiles, making it a defence equipment manufacturer. BDL has also entered into the arena of refurbishment of old missiles.

Products and services

Indigenous Missiles
BDL is the nodal agency for the production of missiles developed by India. The first such missile that entered production of dynamics with BDL was the Prithvi missile.

BDL manufactures a range of missiles for the Indian Armed Forces some prominent products are listed below:

Agni
In 1998, BDL produced Agni-I were inducted into the Indian Armed Forces. BDL also manufactures other missiles and systems for the Indian Armed Forces

Akash
Akash (Sanskrit: आकाश Ākāś "Sky") is a medium-range surface-to-air missile defence system developed by the Defence Research and Development Organisation (DRDO), and supported by Ordnance Factories Board and Bharat Electronics (BEL) in India. The missile system can target aircraft up to 30 km away, at altitudes up to 18,000 m. A pre-fragmented warhead could potentially give the missile the capability to destroy both aircraft and warheads from ballistic missiles. It is in operational service with the Indian Army and the Indian Air Force.

Advanced Light Weight Torpedo
It can be launched from a Ship, a Helicopter, submarine as well and available as both war shot / exercise modes. Homing can be passive / active / mixed modes. Multiple search pattern capability.

Counter Measures Dispensing Systems
Counter Measures Dispensing System (CMDS) is chaff and flare dispensing system. CMDS is an airborne defensive system providing self-protection to the aircraft by passive ECM against radar guided & IR seeking, air & ground launched missiles. Protection to the aircraft is achieved by misguiding the missiles by dispensing of chaff and/or flare payloads.

MILAN 2T
This is a second generation, semi-automatic, tube launched, optically tracked missiles with tandem warhead.

Konkurs – M
This is a second generation, semi-automatic, antitank, tube launched, optically tracked, wire guided and aero-dynamically controlled missile. It is designed to destroy moving and stationary armoured targets with Explosives Reactive Armours at a range of 75 to 4000 metres.

Salient Features : Can be launched either from BMP-2 or from ground launcher. Tandem Warhead Simple in operation and immune to Electronic Counter measures High hit and kill probability Portable and Para droppable. Hermetically sealed ensuring long storage life.

Invar
Invar is weapon fired from the Gun barrel of T-90 Tank. The missile has a semi-automatic control system, tele-orienting in the laser beam. This is high velocity jamming immune missile with tandem warhead designed to defeat explosive reactive armour. Intended to destroy stationary and moving targets with speeds up to 70 km/hr.

References

Government-owned companies of India
Manufacturing companies based in Hyderabad, India
Defence companies of India
Indian companies established in 1970
1970 establishments in Andhra Pradesh
Companies listed on the National Stock Exchange of India
Companies listed on the Bombay Stock Exchange